Major-General Chaim Herzog (17 September 1918 – 17 April 1997) was an Irish-born Israeli politician, general, lawyer and author who served as the sixth President of Israel between 1983 and 1993. Born in Belfast and raised primarily in Dublin, the son of Ireland's Chief Rabbi Yitzhak HaLevi Herzog, he immigrated to Mandatory Palestine in 1935 and served in the Haganah Jewish paramilitary group during the 1936–1939 Arab revolt. He returned to Palestine after the war and, following the end of the British Mandate and Israel's Declaration of Independence in 1948, fought in the Battles of Latrun during the 1948 Arab–Israeli War. He retired from the Israel Defence Forces in 1962 with the rank of major-general.

After leaving the military, Herzog practised law. In 1972 he was a co-founder of Herzog, Fox & Ne'eman, which would become one of Israel's largest law firms. Between 1975 and 1978 he served as Israel's Permanent Representative to the United Nations, in which capacity he repudiated UN General Assembly Resolution 3379—the "Zionism is Racism" resolution—and symbolically tore it up before the assembly. Herzog entered politics in the 1981 elections, winning a Knesset seat as a member of the Alignment. Two years later, in March 1983, he was elected to the largely ceremonial role of President. He served for two five-year terms before retiring in 1993. He died four years later and was buried on Mount Herzl, Jerusalem. 

His son Isaac Herzog is the incumbent President of Israel, the first father–son pair to serve as the nation's president, and led the Israeli Labor Party and the parliamentary Opposition in the Knesset between 2013 and 2017.

Biography

Chaim Herzog was born on Cliftonpark Avenue in Belfast as the son of Rabbi Yitzhak HaLevi Herzog, who was Chief Rabbi of Ireland from 1919 to 1937 (and later of Mandatory Palestine and the State of Israel), and his wife Sarah (née Hillman). His father was born in Łomża, Poland, and his mother in Latvia; his maternal grandfather was the Orthodox Jewish Talmudic scholar Shmuel Yitzchak Hillman. The family home from 1919 was at 33 Bloomfield Avenue, Portobello, Dublin.

Herzog's father, a fluent Irish speaker, was known as "the Sinn Féin Rabbi" for his support of the First Dáil and the Irish Republican cause during the Irish War of Independence. Herzog studied at Wesley College, Dublin, and was involved with the Federation of Zionist Youth and Habonim Dror, the Labor Zionist movement, during his teenage years.

The family emigrated to Mandatory Palestine in 1935; Herzog subsequently served in the Jewish paramilitary group Haganah during the 1936–39 Arab revolt. He studied at University College London and was awarded Bachelor of Laws from University of London in 1941. He later then qualified as a barrister at Lincoln's Inn. Following his time at University, Herzog held the position of Chairman of the Union of Jewish Students (then the IUJF).

Military career 
Herzog joined the British Army during World War II, operating primarily in Germany as a tank commander in the Armoured Corps. There, he was given his lifelong parallel name of "Vivian" because his first commander could not pronounce "Chaim"; but another Jewish soldier explained to the commander that "Vivian" was the English equivalent of "Chaim". He was commissioned into the Intelligence Corps in 1943. Herzog participated in the liberation of several Nazi concentration camps as well as identifying a captured German soldier as Heinrich Himmler. He left the British Army in 1947 with the rank of Major.

Immediately following the war, he returned to Palestine. After the establishment of the State of Israel, he fought in the 1948 Arab–Israeli War, serving as an officer in the battles for Latrun. His intelligence experience during World War II was seen as a valuable asset, and he subsequently became head of the IDF Military Intelligence Branch, a position in which he served from 1948 to 1950 and again from 1959 to 1962. From 1950 to 1954, he served as defence attaché at the Israeli Embassy in the United States. Herzog left Washington in September 1954. A State Department official had informed him that he was about to be declared persona non grata. The decision to expel him had been taken following an FBI investigation into his attempt to recruit a Jordanian diplomat. He retired from the IDF in 1962 with the rank of major-general.

Legal career
After leaving the army, Herzog opened a private law practice. He returned to public life in 1967, when the Six-Day War broke out, as a military commentator for Kol Israel radio news. Following the capture of the West Bank, he was appointed Military Governor of East Jerusalem, and Judea and Samaria.

In 1972, he went into partnership with Michael Fox and Yaakov Neeman, and established the law firm of Herzog, Fox & Neeman, one of the largest law firms in Israel.

Diplomatic and political career

In 1975, Herzog was appointed Israel's Ambassador to the United Nations, in which capacity he served until 1978. During his term the UN adopted the "Zionism is Racism" resolution (General Assembly Resolution 3379), which Herzog condemned and symbolically tore up (as his father had done to one of the British white papers regarding the British Mandate in Palestine), saying: "For us, the Jewish people, this resolution based on hatred, falsehood and arrogance, is devoid of any moral or legal value. For us, the Jewish people, this is no more than a piece of paper and we shall treat it as such." In recent years British historians headed by Simon Sebag-Montefiore have included this speech in a book on speeches that changed the world, which includes others by Martin Luther King Jr., Nelson Mandela, Winston Churchill and John F. Kennedy. Furthermore, Herzog raised the voice against the indifference of some Jewish leaders who seemed "to act with indifference" to the light of the said condemnation against Zionism, he asked then: "Where is the Jewish people?" in The New York Times article titled: "Herzog Asserts Jews Didn't Aid Israelis in U.N. Zionism Debate". After the publication of the editorial, "several letters of support arrived to the Israel delegation at the United Nations", he had become a hero for the common Jewish American citizen.

In the 1981 elections, Herzog entered politics for the first time, winning a seat in the Knesset as a member of the Alignment, the predecessor to the Labor Party.

President of Israel

On 22 March 1983, Herzog was elected by the Knesset to serve as the sixth President of Israel, by a vote of 61 to 57, against Menachem Elon, the candidate of the right and the government coalition. He assumed office on 5 May 1983 and served two five-year terms (then the maximum permitted by Israeli basic law), retiring from political life in 1993. As president of Israel, Herzog made a number of visits abroad, being the first Israeli president to make an official visit to Germany, as well as visiting several far-east countries, Australia, and New Zealand. He was also noted for pardoning the Shin Bet agent involved in the Kav 300 affair.

In 1985 during his state visit to Ireland, Herzog visited Wesley College Dublin, opened the Irish Jewish Museum in Dublin, and unveiled a sculpture in honour of his childhood friend, Cearbhall Ó Dálaigh, former Chief Justice and later, the fifth President of Ireland, in Sneem Culture Park, County Kerry.

A park is also named for him, Herzog Park, in Rathgar in south Dublin.

Herzog was an opponent of Saddam Hussein regime in Iraq, to which he referred as a nest "of world terror". He said the world largely dismissed Israel's warnings that Baghdad was becoming a capital of world terrorism, adding that some Western countries helped Hussein develop into a military power.

Herzog reduced the sentences of Menachem Livni, Uzi Sharbaf and Shaul Nir, members of the Jewish Underground, who were sentenced to life imprisonment for the 1984 murder of four Palestinians in the West Bank town of Hebron. Herzog reduced the sentences, first to 24 years, then to 15 years, and in 1989, to 10 years, which enabled the men to be released two years later on good behavior.

Commemorative plaque
In 1998, the Ulster History Circle unveiled a commemorative blue plaque to Herzog at his birthplace on Cliftonpark Avenue, Belfast. The plaque was removed in August 2014 because it had been repeatedly vandalized with anti-Israel slogans. DUP councillor Brian Kingston said, "This is a shocking indication of the level of tension and anti-Semitism which currently exists in parts of Belfast."

Personal life

Death
Herzog died on 17 April 1997 in Tel Aviv, from heart failure caused by pneumonia at the age of 78. He is buried on Mount Herzl in Jerusalem.

Family
Herzog's father was Yitzhak HaLevi Herzog, chief rabbi of Ireland and later Israel. His brother Yaakov Herzog served as Israel's ambassador to Canada and later as Director General of the Prime Minister's Office. His brother-in-law was diplomat Abba Eban, their wives being sisters. He had four children, including Isaac Herzog, a politician who was the chairman of the Israeli Labor Party and chairman of the Jewish Agency and is now President of Israel, the first son of a president to serve as such.

Works and publications

References

External links

 

  Correspondence between President President Chaim Herzog and the German President Richard von Weizsaecker during the First Gulf War
 The End of World War II in Europe: Wartime Letters from Chaim Herzog to Family and Friends, published in Israel's Documented Story: The English-language blog of Israel State Archives:
 http://israelsdocuments.blogspot.co.il/2015/05/the-end-of-world-war-ii-in-europe.html
 
 

1918 births
1997 deaths
Alignment (Israel) politicians
Alumni of the University of London
Alumni of University College London
British Army soldiers
Burials at Mount Herzl
Directors of the Military Intelligence Directorate (Israel)
Chaim Herzog
Intelligence Corps officers
Irish Ashkenazi Jews
Irish emigrants to Mandatory Palestine
Irish people of Lithuanian-Jewish descent
Irish people of Polish-Jewish descent
Jewish Irish politicians
Israeli generals
Israeli Ashkenazi Jews
Israeli people of Irish-Jewish descent
Israeli people of Lithuanian-Jewish descent
Israeli people of Polish-Jewish descent
Jewish Israeli politicians
Ashkenazi Jews in Mandatory Palestine
Members of the 10th Knesset (1981–1984)
People educated at Wesley College, Dublin
Military personnel from Belfast
People from Portobello, Dublin
Presidents of Israel
Levites
Irish Zionists
British Army personnel of World War II
Graduates of the Royal Military College, Sandhurst
20th-century Israeli lawyers